Karine Rubini (born 11 October 1970) is a French short track speed skater. She competed in two events at the 1992 Winter Olympics.

References

1970 births
Living people
French female short track speed skaters
Olympic short track speed skaters of France
Short track speed skaters at the 1992 Winter Olympics
Sportspeople from Seine-Saint-Denis
20th-century French women